Judge Pickering may refer to:

Charles W. Pickering (born 1937), judge of the United States District Court for the Southern District of Mississippi and of the United States Court of Appeals for the Fifth Circuit
John Pickering (judge) (1737–1805), judge of the United States District Court for the District of New Hampshire

See also
Justice Pickering (disambiguation)